Buba Samura (died 2001) was a politician in The Gambia.

Samura was elected as a member of the National Assembly of the Gambia in 1997.

Samura died in a car accident along with the politician Abou Karamba Kassamba, the politician Kunda Kamara, and two others.

References

2001 deaths
Members of the National Assembly of the Gambia
Gambian politicians
Year of birth missing